The 2005 Brigham municipal election was held on November 6, 2005, to elect a mayor and councillors in Brigham, Quebec.

Results

Source: "Meet your new municipal councils," Sherbrooke Record, 8 November 2005, p. 7.''

References

2005 Quebec municipal elections